The Curtiss V was a  water-cooled V-8 aero-engine.

References

Curtiss aircraft engines